Brasema is a genus in the family Eupelmidae.

Species

Brasema acaudus
Brasema allynii
Brasema antiphonis
Brasema aprilis
Brasema aurata
Brasema baccharidis
Brasema bardus
Brasema basicuprea
Brasema brevicauda
Brasema brevispina
Brasema bruchivorus
Brasema cerambycoboidea
Brasema chapadae
Brasema cleri
Brasema coccidis
Brasema corumbae
Brasema dryophantae
Brasema flavovariegata
Brasema fonteia
Brasema hetricki
Brasema homeri
Brasema incredibilis
Brasema inyoensis
Brasema juglandis
Brasema kim
Brasema lacinia
Brasema lamachus
Brasema lambi
Brasema leucothysana
Brasema limneriae
Brasema longicauda
Brasema macrocarpae
Brasema maculicornis
Brasema maculipennis
Brasema mandrakae
Brasema mawsoni
Brasema neococcidis
Brasema neomexicana
Brasema nigripurpurea
Brasema peruviana
Brasema planivertex
Brasema proxima
Brasema rara
Brasema rhadinosa
Brasema rosae
Brasema schizomorpha
Brasema seyrigi
Brasema silvai
Brasema speciosa
Brasema sphaericephalus
Brasema stenus
Brasema sulcata
Brasema willei

References

Universal Chalcidoidea Database

Hymenoptera genera
Taxa named by Peter Cameron
Eupelmidae